Nonbenzodiazepines, sometimes referred to colloquially as Z-drugs (as many of their names begin with the letter "z"), are a class of psychoactive drugs that are benzodiazepine-like in uses, such as for treating insomnia and anxiety.

Nonbenzodiazepine pharmacodynamics are similar in mechanism of action to benzodiazepine drugs, acting as GABAA receptor positive allosteric modulators of the benzodiazepine site, and therefore exhibit similar benefits, side effects, and risks. However, nonbenzodiazepines have dissimilar or entirely different chemical structures, so are unrelated to benzodiazepines on a molecular level.

Classes

Currently, the major chemical classes of nonbenzodiazepines are:

Imidazopyridines
 Alpidem
 Necopidem
 Saripidem
 Zolpidem (Ambien, Ambien CR, Intermezzo, Zolpimist, Edluar, Ivadal, Sanval, Stilnox, etc.)
Pyrazolopyrimidines
 Divaplon
 Fasiplon
 Indiplon
 Lorediplon
 Ocinaplon
 Panadiplon
 Taniplon
 Zaleplon (Sonata, Starnoc, Andante)

Cyclopyrrolones
 Eszopiclone (Lunesta, Valnoc, etc.)
 Pagoclone
 Pazinaclone
 Suproclone
 Suriclone
 Zopiclone (Imovane, Zimovane, Somnol, etc.)

β-Carbolines
 Abecarnil
 Gedocarnil
 SL-651,498
 ZK-93423

Others
 CGS-20625
 CGS-9896
 CL-218,872
 ELB-139
 GBLD-345
 HIE-124
 L-838,417

 NS-2664
 NS-2710
 Pipequaline
 RWJ-51204
 SB-205,384
 SL-651,498
 SX-3228

 TP-003
 TP-13
 TPA-023
 Y-23684

Pharmacology
The nonbenzodiazepines are positive allosteric modulators of the GABAA receptor. Like the benzodiazepines, they exert their effects by binding to and activating the benzodiazepine site of the receptor complex. Some nonbenzodiazepines can be subtype-selective, possibly providing anxiolytic effects with little to no hypnotic or amnesic effects or providing hypnotic effects with little or no anxiolytic effect.

Background
Nonbenzodiazepines have demonstrated efficacy in treating sleep disorders. There is some limited evidence that suggests that tolerance to nonbenzodiazepines is slower to develop than with benzodiazepines. However, data is limited so no conclusions can be drawn. Data is also limited into the long-term effects of nonbenzodiazepines. Further research into the safety of nonbenzodiazepines and long-term effectiveness of nonbenzodiazepines has been recommended in a review of the literature. Some differences exist between the Z-drugs, for example tolerance and rebound effects may not occur with zaleplon.

Pharmaceuticals

The first three nonbenzodiazepine drugs to enter the market were the "Z-drugs", zopiclone, zolpidem and zaleplon. These three drugs are all sedatives used exclusively for the treatment of mild insomnia. They are safer than the older barbiturates especially in overdosage and they may, when compared to the benzodiazepines, have less of a tendency to induce physical dependence and addiction, although these issues can still become a problem. This has led to the Z-drugs becoming widely prescribed for the treatment of insomnia particularly in elderly patients. A little under a third (31%) of all Americans over 65 years of age are taking Z-drugs.

Long-term use is not recommended as tolerance and addiction can occur. A survey of patients using nonbenzodiazepine Z-drugs and benzodiazepine hypnotic users found that there was no difference in reports of adverse effects that were reported in over 41% of users and, in fact, Z-drug users were more likely to report that they had tried to quit their hypnotic drug and were more likely to want to stop taking Z-drugs than benzodiazepine users. Efficacy also did not differ between benzodiazepine and Z-drug users.

Effectiveness
A major systematic review and network meta-analysis of medications for the treatment of insomnia was published in 2022. It included the Z-drugs and found effect sizes (standardized mean difference (SMD)) ranging from 0.03 to 0.63 for these agents. More specifically, the SMDs were 0.45 (4weeks) and 0.03 (3months) for zolpidem, 0.51 (4weeks) for zopiclone, 0.51 (4weeks) and 0.63 (3months) for eszopiclone, and 0.19 (4weeks) for zaleplon. Eszopiclone had the most favorable profile and best evidence to support its use. For comparison, benzodiazepines had SMDs of 0.58 to 0.83, sedative antidepressants and antihistamines had SMDs of 0.30 to 0.55, the antipsychotic quetiapine had an SMD of 0.07, orexin receptor antagonists had SMDs of 0.23 to 0.44, and melatonin receptor agonists had SMDs of 0.00 to 0.13. The certainty of evidence varied and ranged from high to very low depending on the medication.

Side effects
The Z-drugs are not without disadvantages, and all three compounds are notable for producing side effects such as pronounced amnesia and more rarely hallucinations, especially when used in large doses. On rare occasions, these drugs can produce a fugue state, wherein the patient sleepwalks and may perform relatively complex actions, including cooking meals or driving cars, while effectively unconscious and with no recollection of the events upon awakening. While this effect is rare (and has also been reported to occur with some of the older sedative drugs such as temazepam and secobarbital), it can be potentially hazardous, and so further development of this class of drugs has continued in an effort to find new compounds with further improved profiles.

Daytime withdrawal-related anxiety can also occur from chronic nightly nonbenzodiazepine hypnotic usage such as with zopiclone.

Side effects can differ within the drug class due to differences in metabolism and pharmacology. For example, long-acting benzodiazepines have problems of drug accumulation especially in the elderly or those with liver disease, and shorter-acting benzodiazepines have a higher risk of more severe withdrawal symptoms. In the case of the nonbenzodiazepines, zaleplon may be the safest in terms of next-day sedation, and − unlike zolpidem and zopiclone − zaleplon has been found to have no association with increased motor vehicle accidents even when taken for middle-of-the-night insomnia due to its ultrashort elimination half-life.

Increased risk of depression
It has been claimed that insomnia causes depression and hypothesized that insomnia medications may help to treat depression. However, an analysis of data of clinical trials submitted to the Food and Drug Administration (FDA) concerning the drugs zolpidem, zaleplon, and eszopiclone found that these sedative hypnotic drugs more than doubled the risks of developing depression compared to those taking placebo pills. Hypnotic drugs, therefore, may be contraindicated in patients with or at risk of depression. Hypnotics were found to be more likely to cause depression than to help it. Studies have found that long-term users of sedative hypnotic drugs have a markedly raised suicide risk as well as an overall increased mortality risk. Cognitive-behavioral therapy (CBT) for insomnia, on the other hand, has been found to both improve sleep quality as well as general mental health.

Other risks
Sleeping pills, including the Z-drugs, have been associated with an increased risk of death.

In older people this family of medications increases the risk of fractures and falls.

The Z-drug zaleplon may have fewer side effects compared to benzodiazepines.

Dependence and withdrawal management
Nonbenzodiazepines should not be discontinued abruptly if taken for more than a few weeks due to the risk of rebound withdrawal effects and acute withdrawal reactions, which may resemble those seen during benzodiazepine withdrawal. Treatment usually entails gradually reducing the dosage over a period of weeks or several months depending on the individual, dosage, and length of time the drug has been taken. If this approach fails, a crossover to a benzodiazepine equivalent dose of a long-acting benzodiazepine (such as chlordiazepoxide or more preferably diazepam) can be tried followed by a gradual reduction in dosage. In extreme cases and, in particular, where severe addiction and/or abuse is manifested, an inpatient detoxification may be required, with flumazenil as a possible detoxification tool.

Elderly
Nonbenzodiazepine hypnotic drugs, similar to benzodiazepines, cause impairments in body balance and standing steadiness upon waking; falls and hip fractures are frequently reported. The combination with alcohol increases these impairments. Partial but incomplete tolerance develops to these impairments. In general, nonbenzodiazepines are not recommended for older patients due to the increased risk of falls and fractures. An extensive review of the medical literature regarding the management of insomnia and the elderly found that there is considerable evidence of the effectiveness and lasting benefits of non-drug treatments for insomnia in adults of all age groups and that these interventions are underused. Compared with the benzodiazepines, the nonbenzodiazepine sedative-hypnotics offer little if any advantages in efficacy or tolerability in elderly persons. It was found that newer agents such as the melatonin agonists may be more suitable and effective for the management of chronic insomnia in elderly people. Long-term use of sedative-hypnotics for insomnia lacks an evidence base and is discouraged for reasons that include concerns about such potential adverse drug effects as cognitive impairment (anterograde amnesia), daytime sedation, motor incoordination, and increased risk of motor vehicle accidents and falls. In addition, the effectiveness and safety of long-term use of these agents remain to be determined. It was concluded that further research is needed to evaluate the long-term effects of treatment and the most appropriate management strategy for elderly persons with chronic insomnia.

Safety 
A review of the literature regarding hypnotics including the nonbenzodiazepine Z-drugs concluded that these drugs carry a significant risk to the individual. The risks include dependence, accidents, and other adverse effects. Gradual discontinuation of hypnotics may lead to improved health without worsening of sleep. It is preferred that they should be prescribed for only a few days at the lowest effective dose and avoided wherever possible in the elderly.

New compounds
More recently, a range of non-sedating anxiolytic drugs derived from the same structural families as the Z-drugs have been developed, such as alpidem (Ananyxl) and pagoclone, and approved for clinical prescription. Nonbenzodiazepine drugs are much more selective than the older benzodiazepine anxiolytics, producing effective relief of anxiety/panic with little or no sedation, anterograde amnesia, or anticonvulsant effects, and are thus potentially more precise than older, anti-anxiety drugs. However, anxiolytic nonbenzodiazepines are not widely prescribed and many have collapsed after initial clinical trials and consumption halted many projects, including but not limited to alpidem, indiplon, and suriclone.

History
Z-drugs emerged in the last years of the 1980s and early 1990s, with zopiclone (Imovane) approved by the British National Health Service as early as 1989, quickly followed by Sanofi with zolpidem (Ambien). By 1999, King Pharmaceuticals had finalized approval with the American Food and Drug Administration (FDA) to market zaleplon (Sonata, Starnoc) across the US. In 2005, the FDA approved eszopiclone (Lunesta) the (S)-enantiomer of zopiclone. That same year, 2005, the FDA finalized approval for Ambien CR, or extended-release zolpidem. Most recently, in 2012 the FDA approved Intermezzo (zolpidem tartate sublingual), which is marketed for middle-of-the-night insomnia, available in doses only half of the strength of immediate-release zolpidem tartrate to avoid residual next-day sedation.

References

Cyclopyrrolones
Imidazopyridines
Pyrazolopyrimidines
 
GABAA receptor positive allosteric modulators
Hypnotics
Sedatives